David Parham Reynolds (June 16, 1915 – August 29, 2011) was chairman emeritus of Reynolds Metals Co. and an owner/breeder of Thoroughbred racehorses. He was the son of Richard S. Reynolds Sr. (1881–1955) who founded Reynolds Metals in Louisville, Kentucky.

Born in Bristol, Tennessee, Reynolds received his high school education at Lawrenceville School, where he captained the prep school's football team. He went on to graduate from Princeton University and would join the family business where he worked for more than fifty years. He followed his brother Richard S. Reynolds Jr. as president, becoming the last member of his family to head the Richmond, Virginia-based company. In 1986, at age seventy, he stepped down as president but remained chairman of the board of directors.

In 1963, David Reynolds launched the Reynolds Company's production of the country's first all-aluminum beer cans. Because of the light-weight material, compared to the previous steel cans, this innovation became a great success for the company and has dominated the market ever since.

Thoroughbred horse racing
Reynolds became interested in Thoroughbred horse racing and notably owned and bred sprint horse Lord Carson, a multiple stakes race winner who equaled the track record for 6 furlongs at both Churchill Downs and Turfway Park. However, his most famous horse was Tabasco Cat, owned and bred in partnership with Overbrook Farm. In 1994, the colt won two of the three U.S. Triple Crown races, capturing the Preakness and Belmont Stakes.

References

Sources
 David P. Reynolds at the NTRA
 "Reynolds Metals Chief". The New York Times. April 17, 1986.

1915 births
2011 deaths
People from Bristol, Tennessee
Princeton University alumni
American manufacturing businesspeople
American racehorse owners and breeders
Owners of Preakness Stakes winners
Owners of Belmont Stakes winners
Reynolds family
20th-century American businesspeople